Ignacio Santibáñez (1512 – August 14, 1598) was a Roman Catholic prelate who served as the first Archbishop of Manila (1595-1598).

Biography
On August 30, 1595, Ignacio Santibáñez was selected by the King of Spain and confirmed by Pope Clement VIII as the first Archbishop of Manila. On August 3, 1597, he was consecrated bishop by Diego de Romano y Govea, Bishop of Tlaxcala and installed on May 28, 1598. He served as Archbshop of Manila until his death on August 14, 1598.

References

External links and additional sources
 (for Chronology of Bishops) 
 (for Chronology of Bishops) 

1598 deaths
1512 births
Bishops appointed by Pope Clement VIII
Roman Catholic archbishops of Manila
Franciscan bishops
16th-century Roman Catholic bishops in the Philippines
Roman Catholic Archdiocese of Manila